is a city located in Kumamoto Prefecture, Japan. The city was founded on October 1, 1958. As of March 2017, the city has an estimated population of 37,442 and a population density of 500 km2. The total area is 74.17 km2.

Famous people of Uto
Hamanoshima Keishi - retired sumo wrestler, komusubi
Shiranui Dakuemon - retired sumo wrestler, 8th yokozuna
Shōdai Naoya - sumo wrestler, ōzeki
Naomichi Ueda - Footballer

References

External links

  

Cities in Kumamoto Prefecture